Futbol Club Mayagüez is an association football team that plays in Mayagüez.  They currently play in the Liga Puerto Rico.

This team is from Mayagüez, Puerto Rico. They have been playing in the Metropolitan league and National league. In the year 2008, it was recognized as the third largest team on the island. They have won many tournaments, games, leagues, etc. Their motto is El orgullo de ser el más grande, Spanish for "The pride of being the biggest". This team has categories of all ages. To name a few there are u-6, u-8 or u-9, u-10, u- 12 or u-13, u-15, u-17 and open, masculine and feminino

Current squad
April 7, 2013

Club hierarchy

Mayagüez Ltd.

Chairman: Luis A. Vargas

Mayagüez plc.

Vice President : Gustavo Vargas

Club treasure  : Cristina Vargas

Club Secretary : Eddie Casiano

Achievements

Liga Nacional
Lost their first game 6–2 to Academia Quintana.

References

External links

Liga Nacional de Fútbol de Puerto Rico teams
Sports in Mayagüez, Puerto Rico
Football clubs in Puerto Rico
Puerto Rico Soccer League teams
2004 establishments in Puerto Rico